Ngata is a Māori surname, most commonly found among members of the Ngāti Porou iwi. The name is also occasionally found in Tonga, where it was the name of a 17th-century leader, the first Tu'i Kanokupolu.

List
Notable people with the surname include:
 Sir Āpirana Ngata (1874–1950), New Zealand politician and lawyer
 Lady Arihia Ngata (1879–1829), New Zealand community leader, wife of Āpirana
 Haloti Ngata (born 1984), American football player
 Heremaia Ngata (born 1971), New Zealand association footballer
 Sir Henare Ngata (1917–2011), Māori leader and son of Āpirana and Arihia
 Hōri Ngata (1919–1989), New Zealand lexicographer, grandson of Āpirana and Arihia
 Paratene Ngata (c. 1849–1924), New Zealand tribal leader, farmer, and soldier
 Whai Ngata (c. 1942–2016), New Zealand broadcaster, journalist, and lexicographer, son of Hōri

As a given name, Ngata may refer to:
 Ngata Prosser Pitcaithly (1906–1991), New Zealand principal and educator

Māori-language surnames
Tongan-language surnames